Phetchaburi railway station is a railway station located in Khlong Krachaeng Subdistrict, Phetchaburi City. It is a class 1 railway station.

History 
The station opened in June 1903 during the reign of King Chulalongkorn, along with the first phase of the Southern Line from Thon Buri Station to Phetchaburi Station. At the time, the railway route was called "The Phetchaburi Railway Route".

In 1911, the line was extended to Cha-am Station and then southwards to Sungai Kolok and Padang Besar during King Vajiravudh's reign.

Train services 

 Thaksinarath Express 31/32 Krung Thep Aphiwat - Hat Yai Junction - Krung Thep Aphiwat
 Thaksin Express 37/38 Krung Thep Aphiwat - Sungai Kolok - Krung Thep Aphiwat
 Special Express 39/40 Krung Thep Aphiwat - Surat Thani - Krung Thep Aphiwat
 Special Express 41/42 Krung Thep Aphiwat - Yala - Krung Thep Aphiwat (suspended due to COVID-19 pandemic)
 Special Express 43/44 Krung Thep Aphiwat - Surat Thani - Krung Thep Aphiwat
 International Express 45/46 Krung Thep Aphiwat - Padang Besar - Krung Thep Aphiwat
 Express 83/84 Krung Thep Aphiwat - Trang - Krung Thep Aphiwat
 Express 85/86 Krung Thep Aphiwat - Nakhon Si Thammarat - Krung Thep Aphiwat
 Rapid 167/168 Krung Thep Aphiwat - Kantang - Krung Thep Aphiwat
 Rapid 169/170 Krung Thep Aphiwat - Yala - Krung Thep Aphiwat
 Rapid 171/172 Krung Thep Aphiwat - Sungai Kolok - Krung Thep Aphiwat
 Rapid 173/174 Krung Thep Aphiwat - Nakhon Si Thammarat - Krung Thep Aphiwat (suspended due to COVID-19 pandemic)
 Ordinary 261/262 Bangkok (Hua Lamphong) - Hua Hin - Bangkok (Hua Lamphong)
 Ordinary 251/252 Thon Buri - Prachuap Khiri Khan - Thon Buri
 Ordinary 254/255 Lang Suan - Thon Buri - Lang Suan

References 
 
 
 
 
 
 

Railway stations in Thailand
Railway stations opened in 1903